The characters of Kamen Rider Decade exist amongst various iterations of reality within the series referred to as an A.R. World (Another Rider's/Alternate Reality World). The  are the A.R. Worlds that are not based on a previous entry of the Kamen Rider Series from the Heisei period.

World of Negatives
The  is a parallel world created in the image of the one Natsumi comes from, but is actually home to monsters who assume human form and serve  who hunt down any real humans that are still alive. The backdrop used to enter this world depicts the destruction of the first world caused by the monsters' conflict among themselves, the scene itself matching up with the mother and child running from the flames in the first episode, just before the event was frozen by Wataru Kurenai. In this A.R. World, Tsukasa becomes a contest winner and male model. Daiki's treasure in this world is the K-Touch, which ultimately ends up in the hands of Tsukasa, allowing him to gain access to Decade Complete Form.

Otoya Kurenai
Revealing himself to Tsukasa while thanking him for saving their world, Otoya has an agenda to have Tsukasa become the king of the World of Negatives, testing him personally to confirm it. But his plan fails as Tsukasa refuses and defeats his allies, leaving Otoya as the only surviving Dark Rider.

Natsumi
The  is the World of Negatives counterpart of the real Natsumi Hikari and one of the few remaining humans in the World of Negatives. She confronts her counterpart in an attempt to warn her of Otoya's scheme, only to be forced to dig up the K-Touch she had hidden. She eventually gives her goodbyes to Natsumi while entrusting the K-Touch to Tsukasa, remaining in her world out of hope for the future.

Kanna Mori portrays the World of Negatives's Natsumi alongside her primary role as Natsumi Hikari.

Ryuga
He is destroyed by Decade Complete Form with aid from Ryuki Survive.

Orga
He is destroyed by Decade Complete Form with aid from Faiz Blaster Form.

Dark Kabuto
He is destroyed by Decade Complete Form with aid from Kabuto Hyper Form.

Alternative
Though ordered by Otoya to keep an eye on Natsumi rather than kill her, he intentionally decides to attack Natsumi, resulting in Dark Kiva beating him merciless. Alternative is then later destroyed by Diend.

Chinatsu
 is Natsumi's high school friend who was the president of the student council. Her World of Negatives counterpart died giving her Natsumi the K-Touch which she stole from the Dark Riders.

Raydragoons
 are Dragonfly Mirror Monsters that live in the World of Negatives as Otoya's minions, taking the guise of normal humans. They are destroyed by Diend.

World of Diend
More specifically, it seems to be related to the film Missing Ace, due to being home to the three Ace Riders (even played by the same actors) and Jashin 14 (known as the Fourteen), characters exclusive to the film. But as the world is dominated by the Roaches and their leader Fourteen, the human populace is mostly brainwashed into a state of euphoria and conditioned to see Kamen Riders as disruptors of the peace, and anyone who disobeys the rules, even slightly, has their free will completely removed. The backdrop used to enter this world depicts a wanted poster with Diend's symbol on it in the foreground and a cityscape in the background. Within this A.R. World, Tsukasa assumes the role of a traveling salesman before being labeled a criminal. Daiki's treasure in his homeworld is freeing his brother from the control of Fourteen, only to learn he was not controlled at all.

Junichi Kaito
 is Daiki's older brother within his home world. Like Daiki, Junichi is also a Kamen Rider, setting up the operation to overthrow Fourteen. However, Junichi was actually a double agent who worked to flush out the last two Kamen Riders of their world until Daiki unknowingly captured him, and as a result, played the role as Fourteen's puppet right hand in charge of the area management committee. However, once Fourteen is destroyed, freeing everyone else from the brainwashing, Junichi reveals the truth with intent to be the next Fourteen. In spite of not being able to kill Daiki, with Tsukasa affirming he still has his free will, Junichi considers his brother dead to him and leaves.

Kuroda having previously portrayed a similar character Junichi Shumra in the film Kamen Rider Blade: Missing Ace.

Haruka Miwa
She took part in the operation to overthrow Fourteen and ended up escaping with Shin when the operation was a failure. Since then, she has been on the run from Fourteen's minions. She helps fill Tsukasa in on what is currently happening in her world.

Mitsuya having previously portrayed a similar character Natsumi Miwa in the film Kamen Rider Blade: Missing Ace.

Shin Magaki
After the operation to overthrow Fourteen failed due to Daiki's efforts, he escaped with Haruka. He holds a grudge against Daiki for selling out his older brother but eventually forgives him.

Sugiura having previously portrayed a similar character of the same name in Kamen Rider Blade: Missing Ace.

Jashin 14
He is a massive creature with multiple arms that floats through the air. He is destroyed by Decade in Complete Form with aid from Armed Hibiki, cutting him in half. After his demise, the Roaches vanish and everyone he'd brainwashed were set free.

Bossroach
 is one of the Roach enforcers who watch over the human race, whom he sees to be inferior. Bossroach resembles the Caucasus Undead. Bossroach is then destroyed by Decade Complete Form using Kiva Emperor Form's power.

Darkroaches
 are Category Unknown Undead who are minions of Fourteen, going after any one who breaks the law. Many of them are killed by the Riders and when their master is destroyed by Decade and Armed Hibiki, the Darkroaches fade away into nothingness.

World of Shinkenger

The  is the reality in which the 33rd Super Sentai Series Samurai Sentai Shinkenger and all the Super Sentai series takes place. The backdrop used to enter this world resembles the ending credits sequence of Shinkenger, featuring two kuroko opening up a curtain to reveal artistic representations of the five main Origami. Because it is initially a world without Kamen Riders, the World of Shinkenger is not an A.R. World until Chinomanako obtains the DienDriver and transforms, becoming a distortion that threatens the world itself. The storyline takes place after Shinkenger Act (episodes) 20 and during Act 21, with the episodes airing on July 12 and July 19, 2009. Within this world, Tsukasa finds himself as one of the kuroko of the Shiba Household, discarding the guise when the distortion begins. Daiki's treasure in this world is the Ika Origami, which he steals in the teaser at the end of Shinkenger Act 20.

The Shinkengers
The  are six young men and women who use a special kanji-based power called  to combat the evil Gedoushu as superpowered samurai. They consist of the Shiba Household lord Shinken Red, Takeru Shiba, and his vassals: Shinken Blue, Ryunosuke Ikenami; Shinken Pink, Mako Shiraishi; Shinken Green, Chiaki Tani; Shinken Yellow, Kotoha Hanaori; and Shinken Gold, Genta Umemori. They are accompanied by the Shiba Household's retainer Hikoma Kusakabe and many kuroko.

The Gedoushu
The  are malevolent spirits that dwell in the Sanzu River. They enter the mortal world through gaps to inflict terror on the humans to allow the river to flood over both worlds. Under their control are the  who enter the mortal world, assisted by the Nanashi Company.

 reprises his voice role as Shitari of the Bones.

Chinomanako
 is an Ayakashi that steals the DienDriver and is able to become , the World of Shinkengers' first native Kamen Rider and thus a living distortion that threatens the world. Like Diend, Chinomanako Diend is armed with Kamen Ride Cards as well as Kaijin Ride Cards that allow him to summon the Moose Fangire and the Eagle Undead. He also summons Kamen Rider Blade, which brings to his downfall as Decade uses the Blade Final Form Ride card to turn him into Blade Blade, which Shinken Red wields. While Shinken Pink, Shinken Green and Shinken Gold defeat the Moose Fangire and Shinken Blue, Shinken Yellow and Kamen Rider Kuuga defeat the Eagle Undead, Chinomanako is destroyed by the teamwork of Decade Complete Form and Shinken Red, after being weakened by a combo Royal Straight Flush attack with Blade King Form.

World of Black RX
The  is the version of reality where Kamen Rider Black RX takes place. The backdrop used to arrive in this world features the Crisis Empire's battleship in the background. Daiki's treasure in this world is Apollo Geist's Perfecter.

Kotaro Minami (Black RX)
However, with Dai-Shocker appearing in his world, he finds himself outmatched by the new monsters while searching for his friend Joe the Haze. Natsumi convinces him that Tsukasa is not the Destroyer of Worlds that he heard about. Though he eventually learns of Joe's fate, Kotaro is not saddened as his friend would be with him in spirit.

 portrays the role of Kotaro Minami in the character's World of Black RX incarnation.

Schwarian
 is a Strange Demon Robot from the Crisis Empire, seeing himself as the ultimate machine in his branch. He originally turned down Apollo Geist's offer to join Dai-Shocker until he sees his power first hand. He is destroyed by Decade Complete Form with the aid of Agito Shining Form.

Chaps
 are the Crisis Empire's foot soldiers.

Dai-Shocker members in the World of RX
With Apollo Geist, several kaijin members of Dai-Shocker appear in the World of RX.
 : An Imagin who accompanies Apollo Geist. Destroyed by Decade using Faiz Axel's power.
 : A Fangire who accompanies Apollo Geist. Destroyed by Decade using Agito's Rider Kick.
 : A Fangire who accompanies Apollo Geist. Destroyed by Decade using Faiz Axel's power.
 : A mutant of Gorgom. Summoned by Apollo Geist to convince Schwarian to join Dai-Shocker. He is summoned again to help protect Apollo Geist from Black RX, only to be quickly destroyed by Black's Rider Punch.
 : An Orphnoch. Destroyed by Diend.
 : An Orphnoch. Destroyed by Diend.
 : An Orphnoch. Destroyed by Diend.
 : A tarantula Worm.
 : A tarantula Worm.
 : A tarantula Worm.

World of Black
The  is the version of reality where Kamen Rider Black takes place, a parallel world to the World of Black RX. Apollo Geist arrives in this world prior to its RX counterpart, recruiting the cult Gorgom as a result.

Kotaro Minami (Black)
Unlike his counterpart in the World of Black RX, he is warned of Decade and initially sees him as an enemy. It is not until the interference of Dai-Shocker does he finally consider Decade as an ally, revealing that he has been fighting Dai-Shocker with the aid of Joe the Haze.

Tetsuo Kurata also portrays the role of Kotaro Minami in the character's World of Black incarnation.

World of Amazon
The  is the version of reality where Kamen Rider Amazon takes place. By the time Decade arrives, he finds the world is under Dai-Shocker's control as they eliminate any resistance. As a result, the people do not trust each other, as they cannot tell who is and who is not aligned with Dai-Shocker. The backdrop used to arrive in this world depicts the Amazon Rainforest with Amazon in the middle of it. Within this A.R. World, Tsukasa wears the attire of a baseball player. Daiki's treasure in this world is the GaGa Armlet.

Amazon
Though disillusioned after Masahiko used him to get the GiGi Armlet, Amazon regains his trust in humanity when the boy returns the armlet, finding his place by the Okamura. Afterwards, he aids Decade in battle against Apollo Geist and Llumu Qhimil, forcing Apollo Geist into retreat with his Dai Setsudan and destroying Llumu with his Super Dai Setsudan after Decade equipped him with the GaGa Armlet.

Masahiko Okamura
 is a 4th grade student whose father died a year prior to Dai-Shocker's arrival, escaping the pain of his father's death by joining the Shocker School that has been established in his world. Because he excels in exposing rebels, Llumu Qhimil uses the boy to find Amazon's hideout. But during the fight, Dai-Shocker's forces turn on him, leading him to take GiGi Armlet from Amazon to get back in Dai-Shocker's good graces. When he is turned in to become the first of Llumu Qhimil's monster conversion project, he realizes that the truth and helps in regaining Amazon's GiGi Armlet and faith in people.

Ritsuko Okamura
 is Masahiko's older sister and is a school nurse at the Shocker School. When she discovers that the Hikari Studio group has infiltrated the school, she sends Shocker Combatmen after them, until Masahiko proves to her that the Kamen Riders are not evil.

Dai-Shocker members in the World of Amazon
Several kaijin members of Dai-Shocker appear in the World of Amazon.
 : A porcupine Gurongi. Destroyed when Amazon used his Jaguar Shock on him.
 : A Mantis Lord, destroyed by Kuuga Titan Form's Calamity Titan attack.
 : A carpenter ant Worm destroyed by Decade's Dimension Kick.
 : A cat Makamou. Destroyed when Amazon used his Big Slice on him.
 
 
 : A volunteer military police formed from the residents of the World of Amazon who act in flushing out potential threats.
 : Formerly the Vigilantes' leader who gets transformed into a Makamou as a reward by Llumu Qhimil using the powers of both the GiGi and GaGa armlets on him.

World of the Rider War
The  is the iteration of reality where the Rider War takes place and is the reality that is the confluence of the Nine Worlds. The backdrop used to enter this world depicts all nine of the Heisei Riders, the DenLiner, Dragredder, Castle Doran, and Ryokuōzaru rushing at Decade, mirroring the very opening scene of the series. In addition, all of the villains created for Decade make another appearance. Going into the World of the Rider War, the only "worlds" remaining are of Blade's, Kiva's and Hibiki's.  Daiki's treasure in this world seems to be the friendship of Tsukasa.

Yuki
 is the Queen of the Fangires from the World of Kiva. Though she supports Wataru, Yuki actually sides with Apollo Geist, marrying him to give him immortality so she can have a place in Dai-Shocker. When Tsukasa crashes the wedding, the Thorn Fangire fights him and is killed by Decade Complete Form with Ryuki Survive's power.

 portrays Yuki, having portrayed the similar character Mio Suzuki in Kamen Rider Kiva. She is also known for her role as Mari Sonoda in Kamen Rider 555.

World of Kiva Kamen Riders
Wataru as Kamen Rider Kiva of the World of Kiva leads these two Kamen Riders in the World of the Rider War, fighting the World of Blade's Kamen Riders.
 Kamen Rider Rising Ixa: Killed by Blade in the initial battle.
 Kamen Rider Saga: Fights in the initial battle and later kills Akira and Todoroki before being killed by Hibiki.

Fangires

However, they are actually on Dai-Shocker's side.
 : Destroyed by Diend.
 : Destroyed by Diend.
 : Destroyed by Diend.
 : Aiding in the fight against the World of Blade, Yuki sics him on Tsukasa when he refuses to aid their side. The Fangire is easily destroyed by Decade in seconds as a result.

World of Blade Kamen Riders
Kazuma Kendate of the World of Blade leads the two remaining Kamen Riders in the World of the Rider War against the World of Kiva's Riders. When Super Apollo Geist speeds up the convergence of the Nine Worlds, the World of Blade is destroyed, taking all those from it with it.
 Kamen Rider Garren: Appears in the initial skirmish between his world and Kiva's, Garren later shows up with Kazuma when they help Tsukasa fight Apollo Geist.
 Kamen Rider Leangle: Killed in the initial battle by Kiva as revenge for Rising Ixa's death.

Undead

The  originally from the World of Blade fight alongside the World of Blade's Kamen Riders, fighting against the Fangires in the World of the Rider War. However, they are actually on Dai-Shocker's side.
 : The Six of Spades Undead, destroyed by Diend.
 : The Ten of Spades Undead, destroyed by Diend.
 : The Two of Spades Undead, destroyed by Diend.

World of Hibiki Kamen Riders
Asumu leads the group of Kamen Riders from the World of Hibiki. With most of the other Oni dead, Asumu worries that all of his friends are dead and he is now alone.
 Kamen Rider Todoroki: Todoroki is killed by Saga when he leads the Fangires in an assault against the World of Hibiki Riders.
 Kamen Rider Amaki: Along with Todoroki, she is killed by Saga when he leads the Fangires in an assault against the World of Hibiki Riders.

Nine Worlds' Kaijin
To fight Decade, Diend, Kuuga, Kiva, and Hibiki, Super Apollo Geist recreates the following kaijin from the Nine Worlds:
 : Created by combining Worms. The Phylloxera Worm is destroyed by Diend's Blue Strike.
 : Created by combining Orphnoch. The Tiger Orphnoch is destroyed by Decade Complete Form's Enhanced Dimension Kick.
 : Created by combining Undead. The Paradoxa Undead is destroyed by Kiva.
 : Created by combining Fangires. The Beetle Fangire is destroyed by Kuuga's Mighty Kick.
 : Created by combining Lords. The Buffalo Lord is destroyed by Hibiki.
 : Created by combining Imagin. The Alligator Imagin is destroyed by Decade Complete Form's Enhanced Dimension Kick.

World of Decade
The  is the version of reality that is the true home of Tsukasa Kadoya. It is the primary setting of Kamen Rider Decade: All Riders vs. Dai-Shocker. The backdrop used to enter this world depicts an old mansion that is the home of the Kadoya family. This A.R. World is neither one of the Nine Worlds nor the New Worlds.  This is the world where Daiki got his first treasure, the DienDriver.

Sayo Kadoya
 is Tsukasa's younger sister. She is a pianist and is protected by Nobuhiko Tsukikage due to her possession of the Stone of the Earth, which is the source of Dai-Shocker's travel between the A.R. Worlds. This allows her to become , whom Shadow Moon manipulated to hate Tsukasa and turn Yusuke into her puppet. After realizing that she has been used, she destroys the Stone of the Earth and later makes amends with Tsukasa before he leaves.

Nobuhiko Tsukikage
 is a butler who takes care of Sayo and convinces her to become Bishium as part of his plan take over Dai-Shocker. Through his Shadow Charger belt, Nobuhiko can transform into . Once he ousts the former leader of Dai-Shocker, Tsukasa Kadoya, Nobuhiko becomes its leader as he leads the group to hunt down every Kamen Rider. In the end, though he overpowers Decade and Kuuga, Shadow Moon is defeated by Double and destroyed by the All Rider Kick. While shares the same name with Nobuhiko Akizuki, the original Shadow Moon from Kamen Rider Black, his surname "Tsukikage" means "Moon Shadow".

Joji Yuki
 is a mysterious young man with a prosthetic arm. He was a scientist who worked for Dai-Shocker and was involved in the production of the DecaDriver and the DienDriver. For unknown reasons, Yuki rebels against Dai-Shocker and is punished when the organization's leader at the time, Tsukasa Kadoya, orders the amputation of his arm. This has made him a wanted man in the World of Decade. Though he attempts to get his revenge on Tsukasa when he returns and is dethroned by Shadow Moon, Joji spares Tsukasa's life after seeing him no longer as the man he hated and encourages him to fight Dai-Shocker. He is able to remove his prosthetic arm to attach a powerful laser cannon.

The Joji Yuki of the World of Decade does not transform into Riderman.

Joji Yuki is portrayed by musical artist Gackt, a character also portrayed in his music video for "The Next Decade". A redesigned Riderman costume was planned for the film (akin to the redesigns found in Kamen Rider The First and The Next), but was left out due to time constraints, with only the laser cannon made.

Dai-Shocker members in the World of Decade
Kaijin from the Shōwa Kamen Rider Series
 : A monstrous fiddler crab-like member of Shocker.
 : A member of Gelshocker that is the combination of a crab and a bat.
 : The footsoldiers of Destron.
 : A grotesque Kamen Rider-like form that is the aspect of the Neonoid.
 : An armored cobra-like monster who is the child of the Fog Mother.

Gurongi from Kamen Rider Kuuga
  A leopard Gurongi.
 : A wasp Gurongi.
 : A mushroom Gurongi.
 : A rhinoceros beetle Gurongi.

Lords from Kamen Rider Agito
 : A scorpion Lord.
 : A black carpenter ant Lord.
 : A queen ant Lord.

Mirror Monsters from Kamen Rider Ryuki
 : A dragonfly larva Mirror Monster.
 : A dragonfly Mirror Monster.
 : A robotic cricket Mirror Monster.

Orphnoch from Kamen Rider 555
 : A butterfly Orphnoch.
 : A giraffe Orphnoch.
 : A longhorn beetle Orphnoch.
 : A slug Orphnoch.
 : A wild boar Orphnoch.
 : A pelican Orphnoch.
 : A stinkbug Orphnoch.
 : A grasshopper Orphnoch.

Undead from Kamen Rider Blade
 : The Jack of Clubs Undead.
 : The King of Diamonds Undead.
 : A cockroach Undead.

Makamou from Kamen Rider Hibiki
 : A snapping turtle/frog Makamou.
 : A cat Makamou.
 : A Futakuchi-onna Makamou.

Worms from Kamen Rider Kabuto
 : A scarab Worm.
 : A scarab Worm.
 : A scarab Worm.
 : A centipede kaijin.
 : A crayfish Worm.
 : A horseshoe crab Worm.

Imagin from Kamen Rider Den-O
 : A white lion Imagin.
 : A mole Imagin armed with axe.
 : A mole Imagin armed with drill.
 : A mole Imagin armed with claw.

Fangire from Kamen Rider Kiva
 : A rat Fangire.
 : A giant girdled lizard Fangire.
 : A bat Fangire.

Other Kaijin from Kamen Rider Decade
 : The Buffalo Lord who appeared previously in Kamen Rider Decade.

World of the Rider War (Movie War 2010)
In Kamen Rider × Kamen Rider W & Decade: Movie War 2010, the World of the Rider War takes on its true purpose and is home to the evil Super Shocker organization. The backdrop for this world now depicts the destruction of the Nine Worlds. Tsukasa is dressed in the same clothes from the first episode with a different hairstyle, but now transforms into Decade Violent Emotion. Daiki's treasure in this world is Tsukasa's rider deck.

Yuriko Misaki
 is a girl who lives in this A.R. World who meets Tsukasa during his rampage against the Kamen Riders. She follows Tsukasa, urging him along in his mission to be the destroyer of worlds. Like her namesake from Kamen Rider Stronger, Yuriko has the ability to transform into . It is said that she died in a fight with Wasp Woman years in the past but due to having never found her place in the world, she still searches for it even in death. She finds her place with Tsukasa, the only one who cared for her. In the end, she sacrifices herself to mortally wound Wasp Woman with her Ultra Cyclone attack and save Natsumi from her. Now able to rest in peace having finally having found her place and avenged her death, she disappears.

Super Shocker
The evil  organization is formed from the last remnants of Dai-Shocker, with the destruction of the Nine Worlds and the destruction of Dai-Shocker. In addition to the high-ranking members Super Doctor Shinigami and Colonel Zol, other villains from the Kamen Rider Series make up the ranks of Super Shocker.

Wasp Woman
 was a bee/wasp-like cyborg with a rapier as her weapon, and previously a member of Shocker in Kamen Rider, being the one who killed Tackle while a member of Dai-Shocker. She is now one of the high-ranking members of Super Shocker, going after Natsumi until she is mortality wounded by Electro-Wave Human Tackle's Ultra Cyclone. Wasp Woman releases the Neonoid to make her more powerful, only to be engulfed by it.

Neonoid
Its personality is extremely childish and somewhat sadistic, though it appears it doesn't realize the true nature of what its doing, referring to its attacking the Kamen Riders as 'playing'. Super Doctor Shinigami seeks to revive the Neonoid in order to destroy Kamen Rider Decade. But once revived, it is beyond Super Shocker's control as it consumes Wasp Woman and creates Doras to fight the Kamen Riders. Though Doras is destroyed by a combined finisher from all the most powerful forms of the Nine World Riders, the Neonoid takes control of the Super Crisis Fortress until it is destroyed. However, it survives and absorbs the Dummy Dopant to become the strongest monster  before quickly meeting its end through Decade and Double's Triple Extreme Rider Kick.

Super Shocker Combatmen
The  are remodeled versions of the Dai-Shocker's footsoldiers, resembling the Shocker Combatmen and tending to scream out . Like the Dai-Shocker Combatmen they are also able to assume missile-like forms.

Other Super Shocker members
Kaijin from the Shōwa Kamen Rider Series
 : A salamander kaijin of Shocker.
  A jaguar kaijin of Shocker.
 : A giant girdled lizard kaijin of Shocker.
 : A member of Gelshocker that is the combination of a leech and a chameleon.
 : An armored cobra kaijin of Fog.
Kaijin from the Heisei Kamen Rider Series
 : A vampire bat Gurongi in Ultimate Form.
 : A porcupine Gurongi.
 : A falcon Lord.
 : A armored tetragnatha praedonia Mirror Monster.
 : A scorpion Orphnoch.
 : A scorpion/chameleon Undead.
 : A tree Makamou.
 : A mantis Worm.
 : A cobra Imagin.
 : A gecko Imagin.
 : A giant girdled lizard Fangire.

Alternate Kamen Rider Decade
In the director's cut of the film, Natsumi has a dream where she sees Tsukasa being attacked by an evil doppelgänger of himself which transforms into a version of Kamen Rider Decade Complete Form which has a series of Decade Complete Final Kamen Rider Cards instead of the Kamen Ride Cards of the Nine Worlds' Kamen Riders. This other Kamen Rider Decade attacks the original Tsukasa, shortly before Natsumi wakes from her dream. The scene featuring this encounter originally appeared in the teaser for the film in the television series' finale.

Notes

References

External links
 Cast and Characters at TV Asahi

Decade (New Worlds)